Dale Shuttleworth (born 5 August 1964) is an Australian Liberal National politician who was the member of the Legislative Assembly of Queensland for Ferny Grove from 2012 to 2015, having defeated the Minister of Health Geoff Wilson at the 2012 state election.

Early life and education
Shuttleworth was born in Mackay, Queensland.

After 12 years' service in the Royal Australian Navy (RAN) in 1994 retired from active duty. In 1996 Shuttleworth moved back to Queensland, and in the time since, has married and raised his three children in the local area he represented.

Whilst in the Navy he gained qualifications in Electronic Engineering. After leaving the Navy he furthered his study, completing a Graduate Diploma in Business Management through Deakin University and the Company Directors Diploma through the Australian Institute of Company Directors.

Prior to being elected as the State Member for Ferny Grove he was employed with an Australian software development company, where he was successful in business development and account management. Shuttleworth has been a senior manager for a number of Brisbane-based companies providing technical solutions in Communications, Flow (Water/Wastewater) monitoring and telemetry systems or automated machine guidance and GPS collision avoidance or geo-fencing applications.

Politics
Prior to joining the LNP, Shuttleworth stood in several elections for the Family First Party. He was a Family First at the 2004 federal election (in Dickson), the 2006 state election (in Everton), and the 2007 federal election (in Dickson). Shuttleworth first contested Ferny Grove at the 2009 state election. He lost to Labor incumbent Geoff Wilson, but reduced the Labor margin from 11 percent to four percent.  Three years later, he defeated Wilson as part of an LNP wave that swept Queensland.  He scored a 14-point swing, turning Ferny Grove into a safe LNP seat.

In May 2012, shortly after his election win, Shuttleworth was appointed to the Health and Community Services Committee (HCSC) which includes portfolio areas of Health, Community Services, National Parks, Sport, Recreation and Racing and Aboriginal, Islander and Multi-cultural affairs. He also served as an advisor to the Minister for Science, Information Technology, Innovation and the Arts as part of the portfolio backbench committee. Shuttleworth was defeated at the 2015 state election by Labor candidate Mark Furner.

References

Liberal National Party of Queensland politicians
1964 births
Living people
Members of the Queensland Legislative Assembly
21st-century Australian politicians
Family First Party politicians
People from Mackay, Queensland